Fesikh or fseekh is a traditional celebratory ancient Egyptian dish. It is eaten by Egyptians during the Sham el-Nessim festival in Egypt, which is a spring celebration from ancient Egyptian times and is a national festival in Egypt. Fesikh consists of fermented, salted and dried gray mullet of the genus Mugil, a saltwater fish that lives in both the Mediterranean and the Red Seas.

Preparation
The traditional process of preparing fesikh is to dry the fish in the sun before preserving it in salt. The process is quite elaborate, passing from generation to generation in certain families. The occupation has a special name in Egypt, fasakhani. Egyptians in the West have used whitefish as an alternative.

Hazard
Each year, reports of a few cases of food poisoning involving incorrectly prepared fesikh appear in Egyptian periodicals, especially during the Sham el-Nessim festival, when the Egyptians consume this traditional pickled fish.

In April 2012, the Canadian Food Inspection Agency issued recalls for whole fesikh mullet, cut up fesikh mullet in oil, and whole fesikh shad that were sold from a store in Toronto. There were three reported illnesses associated with the consumption of the products, which may have been contaminated with Clostridium botulinum bacteria.

However, these reports never deterred the Egyptians from eating this celebratory dish, since they pertain only to improperly prepared fesikh and to expired or contaminated fesikh; the Egyptian ministry of health constantly urges the Egyptians to buy their fesikh from known and trusted vendors and to check expiration dates, or to prepare it properly if they do so at home, and stores selling the fish are constantly investigated.

See also 
 List of Middle Eastern dishes

 
 
 
  (an Icelandic shark dish fermented in salt)

References

Arab cuisine
Egyptian cuisine
Palestinian cuisine
Dried fish
Fermented foods
Potentially dangerous food
Fish dishes
Middle Eastern cuisine